Mathieu Amiot (sometimes Amyot; c.1629 - 18 November 1688 at Quebec) Sieur of Villeneuve, was the son of Philippe Amiot and Anne Couvent.
 
He had acquired a number of properties In 1649, Governor Louis d'Ailleboust granted him land in Trois-Rivières he acquired land through his marriage to Marie Miville daughter of Pierre Miville and Charlotte Maugis. He built his home on a portion of land at Sillery, Quebec, while maintaining a town residence. He also acquired an estate on Pointe Villeneuve, near Saint-Augustin-de-Portneuf, Quebec, which he enlarged in 1677 and 1685.

On November 3, 1672, Jean Talon, the first Intendant of New France, granted to him a fief and seigniory in another domain at Pointe-aux-Bouleaux.

In 1667 he had been granted letters of nobility, but failed to register them prior to King Louis XIV of France abolishing all titles the following year that had not yet been registered .

Despite all his accomplishment and wealth in land he left his heirs more debts than one would have imagined. In 1703 the debts encumbering the estate still amounted to 700 livres, and Marie Miville, who had sold the lands for 1,500 livres, had died (September 1702), probably the victim of the distress due to a lawsuit by her son Charles, the eldest of her 15 children, had brought against her.

Issue 
His marriage to Marie on 22 November 1650 Quebec City bore them many children and from them many descendants.

 Charles Amiot dit Villeneuve (1651–1711)
 Pierre Amiot dit Villeneuve (1653–1714)
 Anne-Marie Amiot (1654–1737)
 Marguerite Amiot (1656–1724)
 Jean-Baptiste Amiot of Neuville (1658–1685)
 Françoise Amiot (1660–1736)
 Jean Amiot (1662–)
 Catherine Ursula Amiot (1664–1715)
 Daniel-Joseph Amiot (1665–1725)
 Mathieu Amiot (1667–1684)
 Philippe Amiot of the Erpinière (1669–1722)
 Jeanne Amiot (1670–1749)
 Étienne Amiot dit Villeneuve (1672–1730)
 Marie Amiot (1673–1714)
 Marie-Françoise Amiot (1676–1758)
 Geneviève Amiot (1678–1678), Sieur of Neuville (1658–1685)

Ancestors

References 

History of Quebec
Quebec society
New France
1600s
1688 deaths
Year of birth uncertain